Edward Charles Rakow (May 30, 1935 – August 26, 2000), nicknamed "Rock", was an American professional baseball player. The right-handed pitcher appeared in 195 games in Major League Baseball during all or parts of seven seasons (1960–65; 1967) as a member of the Los Angeles Dodgers, Kansas City Athletics, Detroit Tigers and Atlanta Braves.

Born in Pittsburgh, Pennsylvania, Rakow signed with the Brooklyn Dodgers during their last season in Brooklyn, 1957, and after three minor league seasons, he spent part of the 1960 season on the Los Angeles Dodgers' roster. He worked in nine games, two as a starting pitcher, and lost his only decision, giving up 18 earned runs, 30 hits and 11 bases on balls in 22 innings pitched. The following spring, he was traded to the Athletics, where he would appear in 121 games over the next three years.

In 1962, Rakow led the A's in games started (35), innings pitched (235), complete games (11), shutouts (2) and games won (14). He led the American League in losses (17) and earned runs (111), and finished eighth in the league in strikeouts (159, which led the Athletics).

he was dealt along with Jerry Lumpe and Dave Wickersham from the Athletics to the Detroit Tigers for Rocky Colavito, Bob Anderson and $50,000 on November 18, 1963. His first year as a Tiger, 1964, saw Rakow lower his earned run average to a career-best 3.72 in 34 games and 174 innings pitched, but it would be his last full season in the Majors. Detroit farmed him out to Triple-A in May 1965, and Rakow remained in the minor leagues for the remainder of his career, except for 17 games with the Atlanta Braves during the latter weeks of the 1967 season. Rakow retired after 1968, his 12th pro season.

He allowed 771 hits and 304 bases on balls in 761 big-league innings pitched, with 484 strikeouts, 20 complete games and five saves. Of his 195 MLB appearances, 90 came as a starting pitcher.

In 1989, at age 54, Rakow was a player-coach for the West Palm Beach Tropics of the Senior Professional Baseball Association.

References

External links

1935 births
2000 deaths
Atlanta Braves players
Baseball players from Pittsburgh
Detroit Tigers players
Green Bay Bluejays players
Kansas City Athletics players
Los Angeles Dodgers players
Major League Baseball pitchers
Maracaibo BBC players
Montreal Royals players
Rapiños de Occidente players
Reno Silver Sox players
Richmond Braves players
Spokane Indians players
Syracuse Chiefs players
Toronto Maple Leafs (International League) players
Victoria Rosebuds players
West Palm Beach Tropics players